The Catholic Agency for Overseas Development (CAFOD) is an international development charity and the official aid agency of the Catholic Church in England and Wales. It aims to tackle poverty globally. Through local Catholic Church and secular partners, it helps people directly in their own communities and campaigns for global justice. 

Established in 1960, it is funded by the Catholic community in England and Wales, the British government (through UK aid), private and institutional donors, and the general public.

CAFOD is part of Caritas Internationalis, the worldwide federation of Catholic aid organisations with a presence in 165 countries and is a member of the Disasters Emergency Committee (DEC) and the British Overseas Aid Group.

CAFOD's Director Christine Allen was appointed in March 2019. In 2019/20 CAFOD's income was £45million and it employed approximately 410 staff along with more than 6,000 volunteers carrying out a range of roles such as campaigning, fundraising, media, office support and youth work.

CAFOD's work is based on Gospel values and Catholic social teaching.

History
CAFOD's origins can be traced back to the launch of a Family Fast Day organised by a group of Catholic women in 1960, who used the money saved through fasting to support a project in Dominica. The Bishops' Conference of England and Wales registered the charity in 1962. Its current governing document dates from 2015.

In 2020, CAFOD launched a new strategy, Our Common Home, based on Pope Francis' encyclical Laudato Si', which calls for a new definition of progress rooted in integral ecology, recognising that everything is connected and hearing both the cry of the earth and the cry of the poor, calling on all people to dialogue in society about how best to tackle the global issue.

CAFOD's magazine, Side by Side, is published quarterly.

Campaigns

CAFOD has had many campaigns over the years and participated in joint campaigns with other charities such as:

 The Time is Now - mass lobby of Parliament
 Power to be (2017, campaign calling on the World Bank to support local, renewable energy to tackle poverty) 
 One Climate, One World 
 Jubilee 2000 
Their current campaigns are:

 Fix the Food System
 Human Rights Defenders
 Push for Peace in Ukraine
 Cancel the Debt 
 Earthquake in Turkey and Syria

Celebrity ambassadors

 Julie Etchingham
 Jo Joyner
 Dermot O'Leary
 Ben Price
 Emma Rigby      
 Delia Smith

International programmes
CAFOD currently has programmes in 32 countries and has offices in Cambodia, the Democratic Republic of the Congo (Goma and Kinshasa), Ethiopia, Kenya, Mozambique, Myanmar (Burma), Nicaragua, Niger, Sierra Leone, South Sudan, Sudan and Zimbabwe.

References

External links

Caritas Internationalis
CAFOD Kidzzone children site

1960 establishments in England
Caritas Internationalis
Catholic Church in England and Wales
Charities based in London
Christian organizations established in 1960
Christian charities based in the United Kingdom
CIDSE
Development charities based in the United Kingdom
Organisations based in the London Borough of Southwark
Religion in the London Borough of Southwark